Anthony Tirado Chase is a Professor of Diplomacy and World Affairs at Occidental College in California.

Research 
Chase's research focuses on human rights, international organizations, and the politics of the Middle East.

Published works 
 Human Rights, Revolution, and Reform in the Muslim World (2012). 
 Human Rights in the Arab World: Independent Voices (co-edited with Amr Hamzawy, 2006). 
 Routledge Handbook on Human Rights and the Middle East and North Africa (2017). 
 Legitimizing Human Rights: Beyond Mythical Foundations and Into Everyday Resonances (Journal of Human Rights, 2013). 
 Human rights contestations: sexual orientation and gender identity (The International Journal of Human Rights, 2016)

References

Occidental College faculty
Year of birth missing (living people)
Living people